Elections to Larne Borough Council were held on 5 May 2005 on the same day as the other Northern Irish local government elections. The election used three district electoral areas to elect a total of 15 councillors.

There was no change from the prior election.

Election results

Note: "Votes" are the first preference votes.

Districts summary

|- class="unsortable" align="centre"
!rowspan=2 align="left"|Ward
! % 
!Cllrs
! % 
!Cllrs
! %
!Cllrs
! %
!Cllrs
! % 
!Cllrs
!rowspan=2|TotalCllrs
|- class="unsortable" align="center"
!colspan=2 bgcolor="" | DUP
!colspan=2 bgcolor="" | UUP
!colspan=2 bgcolor="" | Alliance
!colspan=2 bgcolor="" | SDLP
!colspan=2 bgcolor="white"| Others
|-
|align="left"|Coast Road
|bgcolor="#D46A4C"|34.2
|bgcolor="#D46A4C"|2
|20.7
|1
|11.2
|1
|15.4
|1
|18.5
|1
|5
|-
|align="left"|Larne Lough
|38.8
|2
|bgcolor="40BFF5"|42.3
|bgcolor="40BFF5"|2
|18.9
|1
|0.0
|0
|0.0
|0
|5
|-
|align="left"|Larne Town
|30.3
|1
|11.7
|1
|5.0
|0
|14.7
|1
|bgcolor="#DDDDDD"|38.3
|bgcolor="#DDDDDD"|2
|5
|-
|- class="unsortable" class="sortbottom" style="background:#C9C9C9"
|align="left"| Total
|35.0
|5
|26.5
|4
|12.4
|2
|9.2
|2
|16.9
|2
|15
|-
|}

Districts results

Coast Road

2001: 2 x DUP, 1 x UUP, 1 x SDLP, 1 x Alliance
2005: 2 x DUP, 1 x UUP, 1 x SDLP, 1 x Alliance
2001-2005 Change: No change

Larne Lough

2001: 2 x DUP, 2 x UUP, 1 x Alliance
2005: 2 x DUP, 2 x UUP, 1 x Alliance
2001-2005 Change: No change

Larne Town

2001: 2 x Independent, 1 x DUP, 1 x SDLP, 1 x UUP
2005: 2 x Independent, 1 x DUP, 1 x SDLP, 1 x UUP
2001-2005 Change: No change

References

Larne Borough Council elections
Larne